Chelliah may refer to:

AR Chelliah, Indian religious leader, Bishop of Kanyakumari Diocese
Devasahayam David Chelliah (1894–1979), JP OBE, the first Asian Archdeacon of Singapore
Leaena Chelliah (born 1937), PBM BBM, founded Singapore's first school for children with multiple disabilities
M. Chelliah, Indian politician and former Member of the Legislative Assembly
Raja Chelliah (1922–2009), economist and founding chairman of the Madras School of Economics
Shobhana Chelliah, Distinguished Professor of Linguistics, University of North Texas
Chelliah Kumarasuriar, Sri Lankan politician
Chelliah Loganathan (1913–1981), the first Ceylonese general manager of the Bank of Ceylon
Chelliah Paramalingam (born 1936), Malaysian field hockey player
Chelliah Thurairaja, USP, SLMC, Sri Lankan military physician, Army general, sportsman

See also
Chelia
Chelli (disambiguation)
Chilia (disambiguation)
Shelia